Asura lutarella is a moth of the family Erebidae. It is found on Java.

References

lutarella
Moths described in 1934
Moths of Indonesia